The Kearny Irish was an American soccer club based in Kearny, New Jersey that was an inaugural member of the reformed American Soccer League. Commonly known as the Irish-Americans, the club was renamed the Kearny Celtic prior to the 1942/43 season. The team returned to their original name before the 1949/50 season. In 1944 the club won the Lewis Cup.

Due to mounting financial losses, the franchise was bought by the Newark Portuguese S.C. in early December, 1951. Newark joined the ASL and carried on from the Irish-Americans' record of two wins, two losses and three ties.

Year-by-year

References

Defunct soccer clubs in New Jersey
American Soccer League (1933–1983) teams
1933 establishments in New Jersey
Irish-American culture in New Jersey
Association football clubs established in 1933
Kearny, New Jersey
Diaspora soccer clubs in the United States